The 2010 Croatian Football Super Cup was the ninth edition of the Croatian Football Super Cup, a football match contested by the winners of the previous season's Croatian First League and Croatian Football Cup competitions. The match was played on 17 July 2010 at Stadion Maksimir in Split between 2009–10 Croatian First League winners Dinamo Zagreb and 2009–10 Croatian Football Cup winners Hajduk Split.

Match details

References 

 2010 Croatian Football Super Cup at HRnogomet.com

2010
GNK Dinamo Zagreb matches
HNK Hajduk Split matches
Supercup